Qeshlaq-e Gadilu (also Romanized as Qeshlāq-e Gadīlū) is a village in Aslan Duz Rural District, Aslan Duz District, Parsabad County, Ardabil Province, Iran. At the 2006 census, its population was 94, in 15 families.

References 

Towns and villages in Parsabad County